Verrucaria placida is a species of saxicolous (rock-dwelling), crustose lichen in the family Verrucariaceae. Found in freshwater habitats in Europe, it was formally described as a new species in 2013 by lichenologist Alan Orange. The type specimen was collected by the author south of the Moelvi river (Modalen, Norway), where it was found in woodland, growing on a stone in a shaded stream. The species epithet placida, derived from the Latin word for "quiet" or "peaceful", refers to the "smooth, unbroken thallus and the characteristic but unstriking appearance of this lichen". Verrucaria placida has been recorded in Norway, southern Germany, and Wales, where it occurs in small streams and grows on shaded siliceous rocks and stones.

See also
List of Verrucaria species

References

placida
Lichen species
Lichens described in 2013
Lichens of Europe
Lichens of Central Europe
Taxa named by Alan Orange